Best of Wands History is the third and final greatest hits album by Japanese pop-rock band Wands. It was released on 9 June 2000 under B-Gram Records label. This album consists of selected singles and album pick-ups with vocalists Show Uesugi and Jiro Waku. The album reached #17 in its first week and sold 16,000 copies. The album charted for 4 weeks and sold more than 37,000 copies.

Track listing

References

2000 compilation albums
Wands (band) albums
Being Inc. compilation albums
Japanese-language compilation albums